Nimakidhani (also known as Neem Ki Dhani, 'Neemakidhani is a village located in Fatehpur tehsil, Sikar district, within the Jaipur division, in the Indian state of Rajasthan.  The village was founded by Nyoldanji Kavia in the year 1539 of the Vikram Samwat calendar (c. 1482–1483).  Lying on the border of three districts, Sikar, Jhunjhunu, and Churu, it is part of the historical region of Shekhawati and has a sub-tropical semi-arid climate.The nearest railway station Ramgarh Shekhawati is well connected by trains with Jaipur and Churu.
The Karanimata mandir of this village is very important, statue was placed by Baldanji kavia and regular Puja_Archana (worshiping) is being performed by shri Prabhudan ji kavia.

References

Villages in Sikar district
Populated places established in the 1480s